Generation Star Wars is the second album by Alec Empire, released on Mille Plateaux in 1994.

The original release of Generation Star Wars faced problems related to its artwork, as it featured a stormtrooper (from the Star Wars films) with a swastika on his helmet on the rear of the sleeve. In Germany, the home of Alec Empire and Mille Plateaux, use of the swastika is forbidden, regardless of the context. The artwork was removed on later pressings. On the Geist Records re-release in 2000, the cover art contained only silver text on a black background.

Some of the tracks were later re-issued as part of the box set The Geist of Alec Empire, including a shorter mix of "Lash the 90ties".

Track listing
"Lash the 90ties" – 10:33
"Stahl & Blausaure" – 4:49
"13465" – 4:09
"Maschinenvolk" – 7:38
"Sonyprostitutes" – 5:38
"Blutrote Nacht Uber Berlin" – 6:59
"Pussy Heroin" – 6:24
"New Acid" – 6:25
"Smack" – 4:56
"NY Summer I" – 1:24
"Konsumfreiheit"/"NY Summer II" – 4:36
"Microchipkinder" – 5:13
"Sieg Uber die Mayday-HJ" – 5:13

References

External links
Generation Star Wars CD at Discogs
Generation Star Wars LP at Discogs
Generation Star Wars Geist reissue CD at Discogs
Official Alec Empire fansite

1994 albums
Alec Empire albums